The Passenger (抉擇) is a Hong Kong television series on TVB that premiered on May 28, 1979. Theme song "The Passenger" (抉擇) composition and arrangement by Joseph Koo, lyricist by Wong Jim, sung by George Lam.

1979 Hong Kong television series debuts
1979 Hong Kong television series endings
TVB dramas
Cantonese-language television shows